Olallie Lake Guard Station is a former guard station in the Clackamas ranger district of the Mt. Hood National Forest, in Jefferson County, Oregon. Built in 1939, the cabin is in the Olallie Scenic Area near Olallie Butte and Mount Jefferson in the Cascade Mountains.  It was listed on the National Register of Historic Places in 1991.

Its NRHP nomination explains its significance:Possessing very high qualities of design and execution, the Guard Station is a very good example of an architectural locution invested with special aesthetic and associative values by the agency that created it.

See also
National Register of Historic Places listings in Jefferson County, Oregon

References

External links

Park buildings and structures on the National Register of Historic Places in Oregon
Government buildings completed in 1939
Buildings and structures in Jefferson County, Oregon
Mount Hood National Forest
Civilian Conservation Corps in Oregon
National Register of Historic Places in Jefferson County, Oregon
1939 establishments in Oregon